Celeste Contín (born 17 February 1978) is a former professional tennis player from Argentina.

Biography
Contín, who reached a career-high singles ranking of 236 in the world, competed mostly on the ITF Circuit, winning eight singles titles. She also has a career win over Justine Henin, whom she beat at an ITF tournament in Spartanburg in 1998.

Her career included a Fed Cup appearance for Argentina in 1998, a World Group II Play-off tie against Australia in Canberra. She played in the second singles rubber, which she lost to Nicole Pratt.

On the WTA Tour, Contín's best performance came when she won her way through to the round of 16 at the 1999 Copa Colsanitas in Bogota, having made the main draw as a qualifier.

ITF finals

Singles (8–7)

Doubles (11–9)

See also
 List of Argentina Fed Cup team representatives

References

External links
 
 
 

1978 births
Living people
Argentine female tennis players
20th-century Argentine women
21st-century Argentine women